Jiraniti Thalangjit (Thai จิรนิติ  แถลงจิตร ), born 18 November 1984) is a Thai footballer. He plays for Regional League Division 2 clubside Roi Et United.

References

1984 births
Living people
Jiraniti Thalangjit
Jiraniti Thalangjit
Jiraniti Thalangjit
Jiraniti Thalangjit
Association football defenders